High Road to China (a.k.a. Raiders of the End of the World) is a 1983 American adventure-romance film set in the 1920s starring Tom Selleck in his first major starring role, playing a hard-drinking biplane pilot hired by society heiress Eve "Evie" Tozer (Bess Armstrong) to find her missing father (Wilford Brimley). The supporting cast includes Robert Morley and Brian Blessed. The Golden Harvest film (released by Warner Bros.) is loosely based on the 1977 novel of the same name by Jon Cleary.  However, little beyond character names and the basic premise of an aerial race to China survived the translation to film.

While Brian G. Hutton ended up as the final director, originally, High Road to China was to be helmed by John Huston, and then Sidney J. Furie, before both left the project. The musical score was composed by John Barry. It was the 27th highest-grossing film of 1983, bringing in $28,445,927 at the domestic box office.

Plot
Eve Tozer is a society heiress and flapper living the high-life in 1920s Istanbul. She needs to find her father, Bradley Tozer, before he is officially declared dead or risk losing her inheritance to his scheming business partner, Bentik. She only has 12 days. Eve hires World War I ace pilot Patrick O'Malley and his aircraft. O'Malley is eager to take the job as he needs to leave town rather urgently himself. Eve, also an accomplished pilot, however, is determined to accompany him in his other aircraft, which causes the first of many arguments on the way from Istanbul to China.

Their journey in two biplanes (named "Dorothy" and "Lillian" after the famous Gish silent film star sisters) through six countries leads them to finally find the eccentric Bradley Tozer in China, where he is helping a small village defend itself against a local warlord. O'Malley and Eve help them win the final battle, but their one remaining aircraft is damaged in the process, leaving her seemingly unable to meet her deadline.

Cast

Tom Selleck as Patrick O'Malley
Bess Armstrong as Eve "Evie" Tozer
Jack Weston as Struts
Wilford Brimley as Bradley Tozer
Robert Morley as Bentik
Brian Blessed as Suleman Khan
Sime Jagarinac as Khan's Nephew
Domagoj Vukusic as Chauffeur 
Cassandra Gava as Alessa 
Peggy Sirr as Alessa's Mother 
Michael Sheard as Charlie 
Lynda La Plante as Lina
Terry Richards as Ginger 
Robert Lee as Zura 
Shayur Mehta as Ahmed 
Jeremy Child as Silversmith
Peter Llewellyn Williams as Franjten Khan 
Hai Ching Lim as Tozer's Lieutenant
Dino Shafeek as Satvinda
Anthony Chinn as General Wong
Chua Kahjoo as Wong's Aide 
Timothy Bateson as Alec Wedgeworth 
Wolf Kahler as Von Hess 
Ric Young as Kim Su Lee 
Zdenka Hersak as Countess 
Marc Boyle as Henchman
Kim Rook Teoh as Wong's Lieutenant 
Daniel Clucas as British Officer 
John Higginson as British Officer 
Simon Prebble as British Officer 
Timothy Carlton as Officer

Production
High Road to China is regarded as one of the 'imitators' that populated movie theaters in the years following Raiders of the Lost Ark. However, as in the case of Romancing the Stone, another so-called 'imitator', the source material actually predated the aforementioned Lucasfilm production by four years. Rumor has it that it was "given" to Selleck as a sort of consolation prize for having to pass on Raiders of the Lost Ark due to scheduling conflicts with Magnum, P.I.

In early development, the film was slated to star Roger Moore and Jacqueline Bisset under the direction of John Huston. Then Huston and Bissett dropped out and Bo Derek was to co star with Moore. The budget was to be $16 million. Then Derek dropped out because she only wanted to be directed by her husband.

Filming for High Road to China took place in Yugoslavia with a crew of 231 (145 Yugoslavs, 60 British, 15 Italians, 10 Americans, and one Frenchman).  They also added 50 Yugoslav actors to the speaking cast and hired 4,000 extras. Headquarters for the film company was in the small Adriatic coastal town of Opatija, Croatia, located on the northwest coast of the Gulf of Rijeka at the foot of Mt. Ucka. It was filmed in Opatija and Istria, Croatia. Scenes set in Afghanistan were shot at Kamenjak near Rijeka, while scenes set in Turkey were filmed at Volosko, and the final battle in China was shot in Boljun.

Originally, Bristol F2B replicas were built by Vernon Ohmert of Ypsilanti, Michigan. This aircraft type was in the novel, but after construction, the replicas were thought to be dangerous to fly at high altitude and were replaced by two Stampe SV-4 biplanes, (G-AZGC and G-AZGE), provided by Bianchi Aviation Film Services.

Reception
High Road to China was the only new wide release on the March 18–20 weekend, and debuted atop the box office with $6,156,049. It eventually grossed over $28 million domestically.

Contemporary critics found the movie to be a substandard imitation of Raiders of the Lost Ark. Roger Ebert gave the film two stars (out of four), writing that it is a "lifeless" movie, "directed at a nice, steady pace, but without flair and without the feeling that anything's being risked."

Tom Selleck later recalled:
Patrick O'Malley I'm very fond of ... There were actors at that point who had left a series and started a feature career, but there was no one at that point who was trying to do both at the same time. So that was unique. It also made the jury rather tough, because a lot of people didn't see it that way, so I was walking into an arena where that wasn't accepted. But it's a good movie. It holds up.

Aerofiles, a historical aviation website, considered the film as "Strictly mediocre, with substandard action scenes and the flattest dialogue this side of the Great Wall." Aviation film historian Christian Santoir said: "Arriving two years after 'Raiders of the Lost Ark', 'Raiders of the End of the World' was in the same vein, despite certain missing qualities." Film historian Stephen Pendo found High Road to China "... notable mainly for its aviation sequences, for it lacks character and plot development."

C.J. Henderson reviewed High Road to China in The Space Gamer No. 63. Henderson commented that "Unless one is looking for a pleasant, harmless, non-sexy, non-violent, disinteresting film to take the grandparents to its best to pass this one by."

Christopher John reviewed High Road to China in Ares Magazine #14 and commented that "At best, it's cute, and somewhat endearing, but it's not what people who expect another Raider have in mind. Aside from its breath-taking photography, it is a simple movie which the media people have tried to target for the wrong audience."

Honors
High Road to China was nominated for the 1984 Saturn Award as Best Fantasy Film, while Bess Armstrong was nominated as Best Actress at the Academy of Science Fiction, Fantasy and Horror Films Festival.

Home media
High Road to China was released on DVD by Umbrella Entertainment in February 2012. In February 2013, Umbrella Entertainment released the film on Blu-ray.

References

Notes

External links

1980s adventure films
American adventure films
American aviation films
Films scored by John Barry (composer)
Films based on works by Jon Cleary
Films directed by Brian G. Hutton
Films set in Afghanistan
Films set in China
Films set in Istanbul
Films set in the 1920s
Golden Harvest films
Jadran Film films
English-language Yugoslav films
War romance films
Yugoslav adventure films
1980s English-language films
1980s American films